Ulf Erik Isaksson (March 19, 1954 – December 25, 2003) was a professional ice hockey player who played one season for the Los Angeles Kings.

Career statistics

External links
 

1954 births
2003 deaths
AIK IF players
Los Angeles Kings draft picks
Los Angeles Kings players
New Haven Nighthawks players
People from Sigtuna Municipality
Swedish ice hockey left wingers
Sportspeople from Stockholm County